The 2006–07 ULEB Cup was the fifth season of the second-tier level European professional club basketball competition, the EuroCup. The second-tier level EuroCup is the European-wide league level that is one tier below the EuroLeague level. It featured 24 basketball clubs, from 15 countries. Real Madrid defeated Lietuvos rytas in the final, by a score of 87–75, to lift the trophy.

Teams of the 2006–07 ULEB Cup

Format
This season's ULEB Cup featured a total of 24 teams, divided into four groups of six. The round-robin group stage was followed by knock-out stages. The regular season began in October 2002.

Regular season

The 24 teams played a round-robin tournament competition (home and away). Four teams from each group advanced to the knock-out stage (quarter-finals).

Top 16 

The winners from eighth-finals advanced to the quarterfinals. The matches were played at two games (home and away). The match winner was determined by point differential.

Quarterfinals

The winners from quarterfinals advanced to the semifinals. The matches were played at two games (home and away). The match winner was determined by point differential.

Semifinals

The winners from semifinals advanced to the finals. The matches were played at two games (home and away). The match winner was determined by point differential.

Final

The match was played as one game.

Regular season

Top 16 

|}

Quarterfinals 

|}

Semifinals 

|}

Final 
April 10, Spiroudome, Charleroi

|}

Finals MVP
 Charles Smith (Real Madrid)

Rosters (top 2)

1.  Real Madrid: Felipe Reyes, Charles Smith, Axel Hervelle, Louis Bullock, Álex Mumbrú, Raul Lopez, Blagota Sekulic, Kerem Tunçeri, Marko Tomas.

2.  Lietuvos Rytas: Matt Nielsen, Joao Paulo Batista, Ivan Koljevic, Marijonas Petravičius, Artūras Jomantas, Eurelijus Žukauskas, Tomas Delininkaitis, Andrius Šležas, Roberts Štelmahers, Jānis Blūms, Kareem Lamar Rush, Mindaugas Lukauskis.

External links
2006–07 ULEB Cup @ Linguasport.com

 
Uleb
2006-07